Myanmar national under-20 football team is the under-20 football team of Myanmar. It was known as the Burma national youth football team before 1989. During a ten-year span between 1961 and 1970, Burma thoroughly dominated the U-19/U-20 Asian Cup, reaching the finals eight times and winning the tournament seven times.
The team participated in 2014 AFC U-19 Championship and qualified for the 2015 FIFA U-20 World Cup in New Zealand after reaching the semi-finals stage. This was the debut appearance of the team in the World Cup competition.

International records

FIFA U-20 World Cup

AFC U-19 Championship 

 Champions* : Title shared 
 DNP : Did Not Participate
 DNQ : Did Not Qualify
1 No third place playoff.

AFF U19 Youth Championship

 The under-20 national team played at the 2002 to 2007 editions

Hassanal Bolkiah Trophy

Current coaching staff

Players

Current squad 
The following players were called up to the AFF U19 Championship.

Previous squads 

FIFA U-20 World Cup
 2015 FIFA U-20 World Cup squad

AFC U-19 Championship
 2014 AFC U-19 Championship squad

Recent results and forthcoming fixtures

2022

Honours

Continental
 AFC Youth Championship
  Winners (7): 1961, 1963, 1964, 1966, 1968, 1969, 1970
  Runners-up (1): 1965
  Third Place (2): 1967, 1971

Regional
 AFF U19 Youth Championship
  Winners (1): 2005
  Runners-up (1): 2002, 2018

Other awards
 Hassanal Bolkiah Trophy
  Winners (1): 2014
  Runners-up (2):  2005, 2007

 International U-21 Thanh Niên Newspaper Cup
  Third Place (1): 2017

References

External links
RSSSF Page on AFC Youth Championship

U
Asian national under-20 association football teams